Pyrgocythara cinctella is a species of sea snail, a marine gastropod mollusk in the family Mangeliidae.

Description
The length of the shell attains 4.9 mm.

Distribution
P. cinctella can be found in Atlantic waters, ranging from the coast of Campeche to Brazil.; in the Caribbean Sea, the Gulf of Mexico and the Lesser Antilles.

References

 G., F. Moretzsohn, and E. F. García. 2009. Gastropoda (Mollusca) of the Gulf of Mexico, Pp. 579–699 in Felder, D.L. and D.K. Camp (eds.), Gulf of Mexico–Origins, Waters, and Biota. Biodiversity. Texas A&M Press, College Station, Texas
 Faber, M.J. (2004) Marine gastropods from Cuba described by Louis Pfeiffer: type specimens and identifications with the introduction of Gibberula pfeifferi new name (Mollusca: Gastropoda). Miscellanea Malacologica, 1, 49–71

External links
 
 
 De Jong K.M. & Coomans H.E. (1988) Marine gastropods from Curaçao, Aruba and Bonaire. Leiden: E.J. Brill. 261 pp. 

cinctella
Gastropods described in 1840